2000X is a dramatic anthology series released by National Public Radio and produced by the Hollywood Theater of the Ear. There were 49 plays of various lengths in 26 one-hour programs broadcast weekly and later released on the Internet. Plays were adaptations of futuristic stories, novels and plays by noted authors. Producer/director Yuri Rasovsky and host/consultant Harlan Ellison won the 2001 Bradbury Award from the Science Fiction Writers of America for their work on this program.

Plays in the series

External links
Broadcast order as listed on the original 2000x site
2000X site - NPR
2000X: Tales of the Next Millennia - Amazon.com
OTR Plot Spot: 2000 X - plot summaries and reviews.

American radio dramas
NPR programs
American science fiction radio programs
2000 radio programme debuts 
2000 radio programme endings